Megitsune Buro  is a 1958 black-and-white Japanese film directed by Yasuda Kimiyoshi.

Cast 
 Raizo Ichikawa
 Michiko Saga (瑳峨三智子)
 Narutoshi Hayashi
 Yōko Uraji

References 

Japanese black-and-white films
1958 films
Daiei Film films
1950s Japanese films